The 1978 Washington State Cougars football team was an American football team that represented Washington State University in the Pacific-10 Conference (Pac-10) during the 1978 NCAA Division I-A football season. Under new head coach Jim Walden, the Cougars compiled a 4–6–1 record (2–6 in Pac-10, last), and were outscored 296 to 276.

The team's statistical leaders included Jack Thompson with 2,333 passing yards, Tali Ena with 728 rushing yards, and Mike Wilson with 451 receiving yards.

This was the first football season in the newly expanded Pac-10; the Cougars met the two new members, Arizona and Arizona State, but did not play the USC Trojans.

Senior quarterback Thompson was ninth in the balloting for the Heisman Trophy, and was the third overall selection of the 1979 NFL Draft, taken by the Cincinnati Bengals.

The offensive backs coach in 1977 under Warren Powers, Walden was promoted that December and became the Cougars' fourth head coach in four seasons (Jim Sweeney (1975), Jackie Sherrill (1976), and Powers). He led the WSU program for nine years.

After this season, the running track in Martin Stadium was removed, the playing field was lowered, and the capacity was expanded with new lower seating.

Schedule

^ Note: The Oregon game was later forfeited to Washington State by order of the Pacific-10 Conference

Roster

Awards
All-American: QB Jack Thompson (Playboy, Preseason, Sporting News, 1st)
All-Pac-10: QB Jack Thompson (1st), C Mark Chandless
All-West Coast: Jack Thompson (UPI, 2nd)
Frank Butler Award: Jack Thompson
J. Fred Bohler Award: Tom Larsen
Laurie Niemi Award: Mark Chandless

NFL Draft
One Cougar was selected in the 1979 NFL Draft.

References

External links
 1978 Washington State Cougars at College Football @ Sports-Reference.com
 Game program: UNLV vs. WSU at Spokane – September 9, 1978
 Game program: Idaho at WSU – September 16, 1978
 Game program: Arizona State vs. WSU at Spokane – September 23, 1978 
 Game program: Stanford at WSU – October 21, 1978 
 Game program: Oregon State at WSU – November 4, 1978
 Game program: Washington vs. WSU at Spokane – November 25, 1978

Washington State
Washington State Cougars football seasons
Washington State Cougars football